is a former Japanese football player and manager. He played for Japan national team.

Club career
Omi was born in Tokyo on December 15, 1952. He joined new club Yomiuri in 1969. The club was promoted to new division Japan Soccer League Division 2 in 1972 and Division 1 in 1978. In 1979, the club won their first major title, 1979 JSL Cup. The club won the league champions in 1983 and 1984. The club also won 1984 Emperor's Cup and 1985 JSL Cup. He retired in 1986.

National team career
On May 23, 1978, Omi debuted for Japan national team against Thailand. In 1980, he was selected Japan for 1980 Summer Olympics qualification. He played 6 games for Japan until 1980.

Coaching career
After retirement, Omi started coaching career at Yomiuri (later Tokyo Verdy). In July 2001, he became a manager as Yasutaro Matsuki successor. However, he was sacked in April 2002. In April 2005, he signed with Arte Takasaki and managed the club in 1 season.

Club statistics

National team statistics

Managerial statistics

References

External links
 
 Japan National Football Team Database

1952 births
Living people
Association football people from Tokyo
Japanese footballers
Japan international footballers
Japan Soccer League players
Tokyo Verdy players
Japanese football managers
J1 League managers
Tokyo Verdy managers
Association football midfielders